The Marriage of Mr. Mississippi is a play by the Swiss writer Friedrich Dürrenmatt. The play was written in 1950, but Dürrenmatt continued to revise it until 1980. It premiered on 26 March 1952 at the Munich Kammerspiele, directed by Hans Schweikart. It was then performed in Chile, Israel, and New York. The play was adapted into a 1961 film with the same title. The Iranian director and playwright Homayoun Ghanizadeh adapted the play in 2016 and staged the new production, Mississippi Dies Seated, at the Vahdat Hall in Tehran.

See also
 Swiss literature
 1952 in literature

References

1952 plays
German-language plays
Plays by Friedrich Dürrenmatt
Swiss plays adapted into films
Plays about marriage